The "Alabama Song"—also known as "Moon of Alabama", "Moon over Alabama", and "Whisky Bar"—is an English version of a song  written by Bertolt Brecht and translated from German by his close collaborator Elisabeth Hauptmann in 1925 and set to music by Kurt Weill for the 1927 play Little Mahagonny. It was reused for the 1930 opera Rise and Fall of the City of Mahagonny and has been recorded by the Doors and David Bowie.

Original version

The "Alabama Song" was written as a German poem and translated into idiosyncratic English for the author Bertolt Brecht by his close collaborator Elisabeth Hauptmann in 1925 and published in Brecht's 1927 Home Devotions, a parody of Martin Luther's collection of sermons. It was set to music by Kurt Weill for the 1927 play Little Mahagonny and reused for Brecht and Weill's 1930 opera Rise and Fall of the City of Mahagonny, where it is sung by Jenny and her fellow prostitutes in Act I. Although the majority of all three works is in German, the "Alabama Song" retained Hauptmann's broken English lyrics throughout.

Brecht and Weill's version of the song was first performed by the Viennese actress and dancer Lotte Lenya, Weill's wife, in the role of Jessie at the 1927 Baden-Baden Festival's performance of Little Mahagonny. The first recording of the song—by Lenya for the Homocord record label—came out in early 1930 under the title "Alabama-Song"; it was rerecorded the same year for the Ultraphon record label for release with the 1930 Leipzig premiere of The Rise and Fall of the City of Mahagonny, despite Lenya not being a member of that cast. She continued to perform and record the song throughout her life, including for her 1955 album Lotte Lenya Sings Kurt Weill, released in the United States under the title Berlin Theater Songs.

The Doors version

The song was recorded in 1966 by the rock group the Doors, listed as "Alabama Song (Whisky Bar)". According to drummer John Densmore and guitarist Robby Krieger, the song was presented by keyboardist Ray Manzarek to the group while recording their debut album, and after the other members were dissatisfied with the melody, they changed it. Doors' cover version combine avant-garde, carnival music influences, with psychedelic and ska stylistics. 

Lead singer Jim Morrison reportedly altered the second verse from "Show us the way to the next pretty boy" to "Show me the way to the next little girl",  but, on the 1967 Live at the Matrix recording, he sang the original unaltered "next pretty boy". For the Doors' recording, Ray Manzarek also contributed Marxophone along with organ and keyboard bass.

Personnel
Per sources:

 Jim Morrison – lead vocals
 Robby Krieger – guitar, backing vocals
 Ray Manzarek – organ, keyboard bass, marxophone, backing vocals
 John Densmore – drums, backing vocals
 Paul A. Rothchild – backing vocals

David Bowie version

Bowie, a Brecht fan, incorporated the song into Isolar II, his 1978 World Tour. He cut a version at Tony Visconti’s studio after the European leg of the tour, and in 1980 it was issued as a single to hasten the end of Bowie’s contract with RCA.

With unconventional key changes, the track "seemed calculated to disrupt any radio programme on which it was lucky enough to get played". Nevertheless, backed with a stripped-down acoustic version of "Space Oddity" recorded in December 1979, the single reached No. 23 in the UK. Although Bowie also changed the "pretty boy" line like Morrison, he sang Weill's original melody.

Bowie would appear in a BBC version of Brecht's Baal, and release an EP of songs from the play. He performed "Alabama Song" again on his 1990 Sound+Vision Tour and 2002 Heathen tours.

A concert performance recorded in spring 1978 during the Isolar II Tour was released as a bonus track on the Rykodisc reissue of Bowie's live album Stage in 1991 and on the 2005 reissue of that album.

Other releases
 It was released as the B-side of the Japanese single "Crystal Japan" in February 1980.
 The German release of the single "Ashes to Ashes" in August 1980 had "Alabama Song" as the B-side.
 In 1992 it was released as a bonus track on the Rykodisc reissue of Scary Monsters (And Super Creeps).
 It appeared on the compilation The Singles Collection in 1993 and on The Best of David Bowie 1980/1987 in 2005.
 It was included on Re:Call 3, part of the A New Career in a New Town (1977–1982) boxed set, in 2017.
 Release by The Chad Mitchell Trio on their Slightly Irreverent album.

References in popular culture

 The Watergate Hotel lobby whisky bar is named after this song.
 The political commenter Billmon named his blog Whiskey Bar quoting the song. When he closed the comments, his followers created another blog named Moon of Alabama.

Selective list of recorded versions

The song has been covered often:
 Jazz musicians Eric Dolphy and John Lewis recorded Mack the Knife and Other Berlin Theatre Songs of Kurt Weill, an album of Kurt Weill tunes in 1964. "Alabama Song" was performed by a band consisting of Dolphy on bass clarinet, Lewis on piano, Nick Travis on trumpet, Mike Zwerin on trombone, Richard Davis on double bass, and Connie Kay on drums. The solo order is trombone, piano, and bass clarinet. Zwerin asked Dolphy to "play what [he] felt about Alabama".
 The Mitchell Trio on The Slightly Irreverent Mitchell Trio in 1964
 Dave Van Ronk (of the Greenwich Village folk movement), in 1964 and 1992.
 Jacques Higelin, a French singer, covered the song with Catherine Sauvage, on his LP devoted to Boris Vian in 1966 (French lyrics by Boris Vian)
 Mike Westbrook featured the song in performances of his Brass Band in the 1970s, with lyrics by his wife Kate.
 Bette Midler. The song was included in a medley in her 1977 live show and double album Live at Last.
 Abwärts, the song featured in the 1980 EP Computerstaat the German punk band.
 Dalida, the song was covered by the French chanteuse in English during the 1980s. She changed the lyrics in verses to "Show me the way to the next little dollar" and "For if we don't find the next petit dollar."
 Električni Orgazam recorded a version on their 1982 album Lisce Prekriva Lisabon.
 Nina Simone, on her 1987 album Live At Ronnie Scott's, recorded at Ronnie Scott's Jazz Club in London in 1984.
 It was covered by Ralph Schuckett with Richard Butler, Bob Dorough, Ellen Shipley and John Petersen on the tribute album Lost in the Stars: The Music of Kurt Weill.
 Moni Ovadia, the Italo-Bulgarian actor, in 1997, included the song in his album Ballata di fine millennio
 Ute Lemper in 1991: Ute Lemper Sings Kurt Weill
 The Young Gods covered it on their 1991 release The Young Gods Play Kurt Weill, with the lyrics "Show us the way to the next little girl".
Big John Bates covered it as a duet on their 2019 Skinners Cage LP with upright bass, violin, guitar and drums, omitting "show us the way to the next little girl" to reflect the change in modern sensibilities. 
 Marianne Faithfull performed this song (along with several other Brecht/Weill songs) live on her 20th Century Blues album released in 1996.
 David Johansen covered the song on a compilation of Kurt Weill's music entitled September Songs – The Music of Kurt Weill, released in 1997.
 eX-Girl covered, the song on the album Big When Far, Small When Close in 2000.
 Kazik Staszewski covered the song by interpreting the lyrics and adding a new verse. Moreover, the song was performed in rock style. The song was published on the album Melodie Kurta Weill'a i coś ponadto (The Melodies of Kurt Weill and Something More) released in 2001.
 Dee Dee Bridgewater recorded the song on an album This Is New in 2002.
 Marilyn Manson covered the song live in a show in Berlin in 2003.
 The Bobs, an a cappella quartet, recorded an arrangement of the song on their 2005 album Rhapsody in Bob.
 Arthur H. and Jeanne Cherhal also covered the song live in 2007 at the Muzik'Elles festival in Meaux. The cover was performed in English.
 Max Raabe and Palast Orchester performed the song live (as "Moon of Alabama"), albeit only its first verse and the chorus, recorded on a two-CD set of the Carnegie Hall performance in November 2007 titled Heute Nacht Oder Nie (Tonight or Never)
 Amy X Neuburg recorded a version on Sports! Chips! Booty! in 2000.
 Gianluigi Trovesi and Gianni Coscia recorded a clarinet and accordion version in 2005.
 Dagmar Krause, former Henry Cow member, recorded a version (as well as several other songs written by Bertolt Brecht) on her 1986 solo album, Supply and Demand.
 Johnny Logan covered the song on his album, Irishman in America (2008).
 Viza released a free download of their recording in 2012.
 Chiara Galiazzo, the winner of the sixth series of the Italian version of The X-Factor, presented a dance version on November 22, 2012.
 Justin Vivian Bond covered the song on their 2012 solo album Silver Wells.
 Amanda Palmer covered the song as a duet with Gavin Friday at her show in Dublin on July 18, 2013.
Linda van Dyck performed it on Swedish television show Forsta Samlek on May 10, 1972.

See also
 Other "Alabama" songs
 Other "Whisky Bar"s

References

Bibliography
 

1927 songs
Arias in English
Songs about Alabama
Songs with music by Kurt Weill
The Doors songs
Songs about alcohol
1980 singles
David Bowie songs
Songs with lyrics by Bertolt Brecht
Elektra Records singles
RCA Records singles